Peter Ronald Clark (born 1933), is a male former athlete who competed for England.

Athletics career
He represented England in the 3 miles at the 1958 British Empire and Commonwealth Games in Cardiff, Wales.

References

1933 births
English male long-distance runners
Athletes (track and field) at the 1958 British Empire and Commonwealth Games
Living people
Commonwealth Games competitors for England